The Church of Body Modification is a non-theistic religion with approximately 3,500 members in the United States. The church practices body modification in order to "strengthen the bond between mind, body, and soul" and to experience the divine.

Practices and beliefs
The core belief of the Church of Body Modification is to create a strong spiritual bond between the mind, body and soul. To ensure a strong connection, the Church uses both ancient and modern body modification rituals to show its faith and allow its members to bring the three branches of life into harmony. The Church practices various types of body modification, such as piercings, tattoos, scarification, corsetry, hook pulling, hair dyeing, reconstructive and cosmetic surgery, fasting, and firewalking. It states that anything that pushes the flesh to its limits can be included in their list of rituals. The end goal is to live spiritually complete lives. There is no deity involved. The Church itself helps educate individuals on the various body modification rites. In its Vision Statement, the Church says it hopes to one day be able to practice their rituals without restriction in a world that does not have prejudice against them.

Members of other religions are welcomed into the Church of Body Modification. Since there is no physical location for the Church, home rituals are usually prevalent. There are monthly online classes for members. It does not gain new members from promotion, but solely through attraction to its ideals.

Statement of faith

Status in the Church
There are various levels of membership in the Church of Body Modification.

Board of advisors

The Church of Body Modification is run by a Board of Advisors. The criteria for becoming a board member includes expertise in the subject of body modification and a positive standing in the community. At the moment, there are currently three advisors: Cere Coichetti, Russ Foxx, and Jared Karnes. One of the former advisors Rick Frueh died in October 2017.

Ministers

Below those Board Members are Ministers, who function as spiritual guides. According to the Code of Ethics, "Spiritual guides are to practice and serve in ways that cultivate awareness, empathy, and wisdom."

Legal cases 
In 2001, a member of the Church of Body Modification was fired from a Costco because of an eyebrow ring. The employee sued Costco claiming that wearing the eyebrow ring was a religious practice and thus protected under Title VII of the Civil Rights Act of 1964. The court ruled in favor of Costco, holding that Costco had reasonably accommodated her when they offered to reinstate her if she covered or removed the piercing. On appeal, the 1st Circuit affirmed the ruling, adding that Costco had no duty to accommodate the employee as exempting her from the dress code would result in an undue hardship for Costco.

A 14-year-old member of the Church was suspended from Clayton High School in North Carolina, United States because a nose stud was against the dress code. Her school principal said that she could not find any reason as to why the religion required her to wear the nose ring. The ACLU took the matter to federal court on free speech grounds, and a federal judge ruled in the student’s favor October 8, 2010.

References

External links 
 Church of Body Modification Official Website

Christian organizations established in 2008
Religious organizations based in the United States
Body modification
New religious movements